The German Cross Country Championships is an annual cross country running competition that serves as Germany's national championship for the sport. It is usually held in March. It was first held in 1891 and featured a men's long course race only.

The competition had a break during 1914 and 1918 due to World War I and it ceased to be held after 1937 as a result of World War II. Following the occupation and division of Germany, the two German states set up separate national cross country championships. The Western side of the country restarted the championship in 1947 and this formally became the West German Cross Country Championships upon the nation's creation in 1949. A women's race was introduced in 1954 and the programme expanded further with a men's short course race in 1961 and a women's long course race in 1970. The East German Cross Country Championships started in 1950 and ahead of its Western counterpart in that it was responsible for the first women's championship in 1951. Men's short course was added in 1956 and a women's long course race was held in 1986. For both nations, the first women's races were short distance races.

After German reunification, the West Germany-based German Athletics Association took over the running of the competition and a single, annual German championships was once again held from 1991 onwards.

Editions
All distances in kilometres

Post-reunification

Pre-WWII

References

List of winners
Historie Leichtathletik - Deutsche Meisterschaften (Wald- und Crosslaufen - Herren). Sport-Komplett. Retrieved on 2016-09-05.
Historie Leichtathletik - Deutsche Meisterschaften (Wald- und Crosslaufen - Damen). Sport-Komplett. Retrieved on 2016-09-05.

External links
German Athletics Federation website

Athletics competitions in Germany
National cross country running competitions
March sporting events
Annual sporting events in Germany
Cross country
Recurring sporting events established in 1891
1891 establishments in Germany